This article provides formation lists of the Polish People's Army order of battle at various points in history between 1943 and 1989.

1945 Order of Battle
Following is the order of battle on 1 May 1945. This only refers to the entire Polish People's Army's ground forces. The PPA would be later expanded with the addition of the air and naval arms only after the war.

1985 Order of Battle
Following is the order of battle in 1985, shortly before the fall of communism in Poland.

Ministry of Defense
Ministry of National Defence (Poland) and GHQ, Armed Forces of the People's Republic of Poland
	 
 Military Education Inspectorate
 Jozef Berna Rocket Forces and Artillery Academy
 Air Defense Artillery Academy	
 Gen. Jakuba Jasinskiego Army Engineering Academy	
 Tadeusz Kościuszki Armored Forces Academy
	 
 Polish General Staff
 Signal Forces Directorate
 Signal Forces College
 Polish Armed Forces General Staff and Command College

 Territorial Defense Inspectorate

 Technology Inspectorate
 Aviation Technology Committee
 Naval Technological Committee
 Military Technical Academy
	 
 Quartermaster Directorate
 Chaplaincy Service of the Armed Forces	 
 Munitions Command
 Military Communications Command
 Armed Forces Medical Academy
 Armed Forces Quartermaster Service Academy
	 
 Cadres Department
	 
 Political Affairs Directorate
 Organizational Committee
 Committee for Military Education
 Dzerzhinsky Political-Military Academy in Warsaw
 Political Officers Central School
 Military History Institute
	 
 Finance and Treasury Office
 Organizational Inspections Department

 Headquarters and General Staff, Internal Military Service

 Land Forces Military Police
 Warsaw MD
 Pomerania MD
 Silesia MD
 Air Force Security Command
 Naval Military Police
 Air Defense Forces IMS
 IMS Military Academy

Polish People's Army Land Forces 
Organisation of the Polish People's Army in 1985
 Land Forces Headquarters, in Warsaw
 Polish Front Command, in Warsaw (would have formed the Warsaw Pact’s Northern Front with an authorized strength of 205,620 soldiers in wartime)
 6th Pomerania Air Assault Division, in Kraków (reduced to 6th Airborne  Pomorska Airborne Brigade in 1986)
 6th Air Assault Battalion, in Niepołomice
 10th Air Assault Battalion, in Oświęcim
 16th Kołobrzeski Air Assault Battalion, in Kraków
 18th Kołobrzeski Air Assault Battalion, in Bielsko-Biała
 5th Mixed Artillery Battalion, in Wola Justowska
 8th Supply Battalion, in Kraków
 1st Transport Company
 15th Medical Company
 24th Dropzone and Landing Sites Security Company
 Weapons Maintenance Workshop
 Automotive Maintenance Workshop
 120th Anti-aircraft Artillery Battery, in Kraków
 11th Sapper Company, in Kraków
 6th Signal Company, in Kraków
 22nd Chemical Defence Company, in Kraków
 7th Łużycka Naval Assault Division, in Gdańsk (reduced to 7th Łużycka Coastal Defence Brigade in 1986)
 33rd Company Command, in Gdańsk
 4th Pomerania Assault Regiment, in Lębork
 34th Budziszyński Assault Regiment, in Słupsk
 35th Gdańsk Assault Regiment, in Gdańsk
 11th Amphibious Tank Battalion, in Gdańsk
 20th Rocket Artillery Battalion, in Gdańsk
 41st Tactical Missile Battalion, in Gdańsk
 11th Sapper Battalion, in Lębork
 7th Maintenance Battalion, in Słupsk
 52nd Reconnaissance Company, in Lębork
 29th Anti-aircraft Artillery Battery, in Gdańsk
 23rd Signal Company, in Gdańsk
 7th Chemical Defence Company, in Słupsk
 7th Supply Company, in Gdańsk
 23rd Medical Company, in Gdańsk
 Traffic Management Company, in Gdańsk
 1st Warsaw Engineer Brigade, in Brzeg
 2nd Signal Brigade, in Wałcz
 3rd Warsaw Missile Artillery Brigade, in Biedrusko (Tactical Ballistic Missiles)
 4th Chemical Defence Regiment, in Brodnica
 2nd Internal Signal Regiment, in Bialystok
 2nd Radio-technical Reconnaissance Regiment, in Przasnysz
 8th Electronic Warfare Regiment, in Grudziądz
 10th Radio-location Reconnaissance Regiment, in Dziwnów
 15th Antitank Artillery Regiment, in Gniezno
 61st Surface-to-Air Missile Artillery Brigade, in Skwierzyna
 91st Wejherowo Anti-tank Artillery Regiment, in Gniezno
 1st Assault Battalion (Special Forces), in Dziwnów

Pomeranian Military District 
 Pomeranian Military District, in Bydgoszcz (Readiness level A, would have formed 1st Combined-Arms Army with 91,000 soldiers in wartime)
 8th Dresden Mechanized Division, in Koszalin
 16th Dnowsko-Łużycki Tank Regiment, in Słupsk
 28th Sudecki Mechanized Regiment, in Kołobrzeg
 32nd Budziszyński Mechanized Regiment, in Kołobrzeg
 36th Łużycki Mechanized Regiment, in Trzebiatów
 4th Artillery Regiment, in Kołobrzeg
 83rd Anti-aircraft Artillery Regiment, in Kołobrzeg
 47th Rocket Artillery Battalion, in Szczecin
 1st Tactical Missile Battalion, in Trzebiatów
 15th Division Artillery Commander Command Battery, in Kołobrzeg
 5th Reconnaissance Battalion, in Kołobrzeg
 19th Sapper Battalion, in Unieście
 13th Signal Battalion, in Koszalin
 8th Supply Battalion, in Koszalin
 8th Maintenance Battalion, in Koszalin
 39th Medical Battalion, in Kołobrzeg
 64th Chemical Defence Company, in Koszalin
 12th Szczecin Mechanized Division, in Szczecin
 25th Dresden Medium Tank Regiment, in Szczecin
 5th Kołobrzeski Mechanized Regiment, in Szczecin
 9th Zaodrzański Mechanized Regiment, in Stargard
 41st Mechanized  Regiment, in Szczecin
 2nd Artillery Regiment, in Szczecin
 124th Anti-aircraft Artillery Regiment, in Szczecin
 21st Rocket Artillery Battalion, in Szczecin
 22nd Tactical Missile Battalion, in Szczecin
 87th Division Artillery Commander Command Battery
 16th Reconnaissance Battalion, in Szczecin
 2nd Sapper Battalion, in Stargard Szczeciński
 33rd Signal Battalion, in Szczecin
 12th Supply Battalion, in Kobylanka
 8th Maintenance Battalion, in Gryfice
 45th Medical Battalion, in Stargard Szczecin
 19th Chemical Defence Company, in Stargard
 15th People's Guards Mechanized Division, in Olsztyn (disbanded in 1988)
 35th Tank Regiment, in Ostróda
 37th Mechanized Regiment, in Morąg
 50th Mechanized Regiment, in Lidzbark
 75th Mechanized Regiment, in Bartoszyce
 9th Artillery Regiment, in Olsztyn
 46th Anti-aircraft Artillery Regiment, in Olsztyn
 19th Tactical Missile Battalion, in Morąg
 Division Artillery Commander Command Battery
 12th Reconnaissance Battalion, in Biskupiec
 46th Sapper Battalion, in Olsztyn
 29th Signal Battalion, in Olsztyn
 Supply Battalion
 Maintenance Battalion
 Medical Battalion
 Chemical Defence Company
 16th Kaszubska Armored Division, in Elbląg
 1st Warsaw Tank Regiment, in Elbląg
 51st Kościerski Tank Regiment, in Braniewo
 60th Kartuski Tank Regiment, in Elbląg
 55th Mechanized Regiment, in Braniewo
 16th Artillery Regiment, in Braniewo
 13th Anti-aircraft Artillery Regiment, in Elbląg
 48th Rocket Artillery Battalion, in Malbork
 4th Tactical Missile Division, in Malbork
 Division Artillery Commander Command Battery
 17th Reconnaissance Battalion, in Elbląg
 47th Sapper Battalion, in Tczew
 43rd Signal Battalion, in Elbląg
 16th Supply Battalion, in Elbląg
 Maintenance Battalion, in Elbląg
 57th Medical Battalion, in Braniewo
 61st Chemical Defence Company, in Elbląg
 20th Warsaw Armored Division, in Szczecinek
 24th Dresden Tank Regiment, in Stargard
 28th Saski Tank Regiment, in Czarne
 68th Tank Regiment, in Budowo
 49th Warszaw Mechanized Regiment, in Wałcz
 36th Artillery Regiment, in Budowo
 75th Anti-aircraft Artillery Regiment, in Rogowo
 26th Rocket Artillery Battalion, in Stargard
 7th Tactical Missile Battalion, in Budowo
 Division Artillery Commander Command Battery
 8th Reconnaissance Battalion, in Stargard
 73rd Sapper Battalion, in Gryfice
 63rd Signal Battalion, in Szczecinek
 Supply Battalion, in Szczecinek
 Maintenance Battalion
 Medical Battalion, in Stargard
 Chemical Defence Company
 2nd Pomerania Artillery Brigade, in Choszczno (Tactical Ballistic Missiles)
 5th Mazurska Engineer Brigade, in Szczecin
 6th Warsaw Cannon Artillery Brigade, in Toruń
 7th Howitzer Artillery Brigade, in Toruń
 2nd Pomerania Chemical Defence Regiment, in Grudziądz
 4th Łużycki Signal Regiment, in Bydgoszcz
 14th Sudecki Anti-tank Artillery Regiment, in Kwidzyn
 56th Special Troops Company, in Szczecin (Long Range Reconnaissance)

Silesian Military District 
 Silesian Military District, in Wrocław (Readiness level B, would have formed 2nd Combined-Arms Army with 89,500 soldiers in wartime)
 2nd Warsaw Mechanized Division, in Nysa
 15th Tank Regiment, in Gliwice
 6th Mechanized Regiment, in Częstochowa
 27th Mechanized Regiment, in Kłodzko
 33rd Mechanized Regiment, in Nysa
 37th Artillery Regiment, in Kędzierzyn-Koźle
 99th Anti-aircraft Artillery Regiment, in Ząbkowice Śląskie
 2nd Tactical Missile Division, in Kędzierzyn-Koźle
 37th Division Artillery Commander Command Battery, in Nysa
 10th Reconnaissance Battalion, in Nysa
 18th Sapper Battalion, in Nysa
 48th Signal Battalion, in Nysa
 2nd Supply Battalion, in Nysa
 2nd Maintenance Battalion, in Nysa
 Medical Battalion
 21st Chemical Defence Company, in Nysa
 4th Pomerania Mechanized Division, in Krosno Odrzańskie
 18th Tank Regiment in Wędrzyn
 11th Złotowski Mechanized Regiment, in Krosno Odrzańskie
 12th Mechanized Regiment, in Gorzów Wielkopolski
 17th Dresden Mechanized Regiment, in Międzyrzecz
 22nd Artillery Regiment, in Sulechów
 128th Anti-aircraft Artillery Regiment, in Czerwieńsk
 24th Tactical Missile Division, in Sulechów
 Division Artillery Commander Command Battery
 4th Reconnaissance Battalion, in Międzyrzecz
 5th Sapper Battalion, in Krosno Odrzańskie
 4th Signal Battalion, in Krosno Odrzańskie
 4th Supply Battalion, in Krosno Odrzańskie
 4th Maintenance Battalion, in Krosno Odrzańskie
 65th Medical Battalion, in Krosno Odrzańskie 
 20th Chemical Defence Company, in Międzyrzecze
 5th Saska Armoured Division, in Gubin
 23rd Tank Regiment, in Słubice
 27th Tank Regiment, in Gubin
 73rd Tank Regiment, in Gubin
 13th Mechanized Regiment, in Kożuchów
 113th Artillery Regiment, in Kostrzyn nad Odrą
 5th Anti-aircraft Artillery Regiment, in Gubin
 25th Rocket Artillery Battalion, in Gubin
 18th Tactical Missile Division, in Kostrzyn nad Odrą
 84th Division Artillery Commander Command Battery, in Gubin
 2nd Reconnaissance Battalion, in Gubin
 14th Sapper Battalion, in Kostrzyn nad Odrą
 59th Signal Battalion, in Gubin
 5th Supply Battalion, in Kostrzyn nad Odrą
 5th Maintenance Battalion, in Gubin
 56th Medical Battalion, in Gubin
 60th Chemical Defence Company, in Gubin
 10th Sudeten Armoured Division, in Opole
 2nd Tank Regiment, in Opole
 10th Tank Regiment, in Opole
 13th Tank Regiment, in Opole
 25th Mechanized Regiment, in Opole
 39th Artillery Regiment, in Tarnowskie Góry
 18th Anti-aircraft Artillery Regiment, in Jelenia Góra
 8th Tactical Missile Division, in Tarnowskie Góry
 83rd Division Artillery Commander Command Battery, in Tarnowskie Góry
 7th Reconnaissance Battalion, in Brzeg
 41st Signal Battalion, in Opole
 21st Sapper Battalion, in Świdnica
 Supply Battalion, in Opole
 Maintenance Battalion, in Opole
 54th Medical Battalion, in Opole
 58th Chemical Defence Company, in Opole
 11th Dresden Armored Division, in Żagań
 3rd Tank Regiment, in Żagań
 8th Tank Regiment, in Żagań
 29th Tank Regiment, in Żagań
 42nd Mechanized Regiment, in Żary
 33rd Artillery Regiment, in Żary
 66th Anti-aircraft Artillery Regiment, in Bolesławiec
 43rd Rocket Artillery Battalion, in Żary
 10th Tactical Missile Battalion, in Żary
 17th Division Artillery Commander Command Battery, in Żagan
 9th Reconnaissance Battalion, in Żagań
 16th Sapper Battalion, in Żary
 34th Signal Battalion, in Żagań
 Supply Battalion, in Żagań
 11th Maintenance Battalion, in Żagan
 11th Medical Battalion, in Żagan
 17th Chemical Defence Company, in Żagan
 4th Łużycka Engineer Brigade, in Gorzów Wielkopolski
 5th Pomerania Artillery Brigade, in Głogów
 14th Howitzer Artillery Brigade, in Głogów
 18th Artillery Brigade, in Bolesławiec (Tactical Ballistic Missiles)
 1st Chemical Defence Regiment, in Zgorzelec
 6th Security Regiment, in Wrocław
 10th Saski Signal Regiment, in Wrocław
 20th Anti-tank Artillery Regiment, in Pleszew
 62nd Special Forces Company, in Bolesławiec (Long Range Reconnaissance)

Warsaw Military District 
 Warsaw Military District, in Warsaw (Readiness level C, would have formed 4th Combined-Arms Army with 64,700 soldiers in wartime)
 1st Warsaw Mechanized Division, in Legionowo
 11th Tank Regiment, in Giżycko
 1st Praski Mechanized Regiment, in Wesoła
 2nd Berliń Mechanized Regiment, in Skierniewice
 3rd Berliń Mechanized Regiment, in Ciechanów
 1st Berliń Artillery Regiment, in Bartoszyce
 1st Darnicki Anti-aircraft Artillery Regiment, in Modlin
 5th Tactical Missile Battalion, in Giżycko
 Division Artillery Commander Command Battery
 1st Reconnaissance Battalion
 1st Sapper Battalion, in Pułtusk
 Signal Battalion, in Legionowo
 1st Supply Battalion, in Legionowo
 1st Maintenance Battalion, in Łomża
 53rd Medical Battalion, in Skierniewice
 1st Chemical Defence Company, in Siedlce
 3rd Pomerania Mechanized Division, in Lublin (disbanded in 1988)
 5th Tank Regiment, in Włodawa
 7th Mechanized Regiment, in Lublin
 8th Mechanized Regiment, in Hrubieszów
 45th Mechanized Regiment, in Siedlce
 3rd Artillery Regiment, in Chełm
 18th Anti-aircraft Artillery Battalion, in Siedlce
 42nd Tactical Missile Battalion, in Choszczno
 Division Artillery Commander Command Battery
 3rd Reconnaissance Battalion, in Lublin
 Sapper Battalion
 53rd Signal Battalion, in Lublin
 3rd Supply Battalion, in Lublin
 3rd Maintenance Battalion, in Lublin
 Medical Battalion
 Chemical Defence Company
 9th Mechanized  Division, in Rzeszów
 26th Tank Regiment, in Sanok
 4th Mechanized Regiment, in Kielce
 14th Kołobrzeski Mechanized Regiment, in Tarnów
 30th Mechanized Regiment, in Rzeszów
 40th Artillery Regiment, in Jarosław
 23rd Anti-aircraft Artillery Battalion, in Jarosław
 44th Tactical Missile Battalion, in Toruń
 Division Artillery Commander Command Battery
 23rd Reconnaissance Battalion, in Jarosław
 13th Sapper Battalion, in Dębica
 30th Signal Battalion, in Rzeszów
 17th Supply Battalion, in Łańcut
 Maintenance Battalion
 Medical Battalion
 Chemical Defence Company
 1st Warsaw Cannon Artillery Brigade, in Węgorzewo
 8th Howitzer Artillery Brigade, in Węgorzewo
 2nd Warszawska Engineer Brigade, in Kazuń Nowy
 32nd Łużycka Artillery Brigade, in Orzysz (Tactical Ballistic Missiles)
 3rd Chemical Defence Regiment, in Biskupiec
 5th Podhale Rifles Regiment, in Kraków
 9th Signal Regiment, in Białobrzegi
 15th Anti-aircraft Artillery Regiment, in Gołdap
 80th Anti-tank Artillery Battalion, in Suwałki
 48th Special Forces Company, in Kraków (Long Range Reconnaissance)

Map of Army locations

Air Force 
Polish Air Force
 Polish Air Force Headquarters (Poznań)
 Air Education Command
Polish Air Force Academy
 38th Training Regt
 58th Training Regt
 60th Training Regt
 61st Training Regt

 Strategic Air Fighter Corps
 2nd "Bradenburg" Air Fighter-Bomber Division - Piła
 3rd "Bradenburg" Air Fighter-Bomber Division - Świdwin
 4th "Pomerania" Air Fighter-Bomber Division - Malbork

 Air Combat Auxiliary and Transport Command
 32nd Air Interceptor Regt
 49th Helicopter Regt
 56th Helicopter Regt
 13th Air Transport Regt - Kraków
 36th Air Transport Regt
 37th Air Transport Regt- Warsaw

Navy
Polish Navy
 Polish Navy Headquarters (Gdynia)
 Political Service and Headquarters Command
 Central Band of the Polish Navy

 Polish Navy Fleet Forces
 3rd Flotilla
 8th Coastal Defense Flotilla
 9th Coastal Defense Flotilla

 Land formations under Navy HQ
3rd Independent Marine Anti-Tank Regiment
 6th Marine Radio-electronic Regiment
11th Naval Engineering Regiment

 Naval Technical and Support Command
 9th Artillery Division (Coastal), under the Naval Technical Base
 Naval Warehouses

 Polish Naval Aviation
 7th Naval Fighter Regt
 16th Naval Aviation Regt (Special Purpose)
 15th Patrol Squadron
 18th Air Engineers Squadron
 42nd Naval Aviation Repair and Maintenance Workshops

 Naval Education and Training Command
 Polish Naval Academy "Heroes of Westerplatte" - Gdynia
 Central Naval Specialists School
 Naval Sailing Institute
 Naval Divers School

Air Defense Force

Territorial Army
 Polish Territorial Defense Forces
 TDF Headquarters (Warsaw)

Internal Defense Forces of the Ministry of National Defense 
 IDF Units under the National Defense Commission and the State Committee for Territorial Defense
 1st IDF Brigade -  Góra Kalwaria
 2nd IDF Brigade 
 5th IDF Brigade
 14th IDF Brigade
 8th IDF Regiment
 20th IDF Logistics Brigade - Kielce
 2nd IDF Signals Regiment
 Ground defense units of the IDF
 3rd IDF Regiment - Lublin
 13th IDF Regiment - Gdańsk
 15th IDF Regiment -  Prudnik
 10th IDF Regiment
 IDF Pontoon Units
 IDF Engineering and Rescue units
 2nd IDF Engineering and Rescue Battalion
 4th IDF Engineering and Rescue Battalion
 6th IDF Engineering and Rescue Battalion

Territorial Defense Forces of the Ministry of National Defense 
 TDF Engineering Battalions
 IDF Area Defense Battalions

Formations outside the regular armed forces but are wartime attached 
The following organizations formed the wartime auxiliary to the Armed Forces in times of war.

 Milicja Obywatelska
 Border Protection Troops
 Vistula Military Corps of the Ministry of Interior and Administration 
 Straż Marszałkowska

Citations

Sources
 Czesław Grzelak, Henryk Stańczyk, and Stefan Zwoliński, Armia Berlinga i Żymierskiego, Warsaw: Wydawnictwo Neriton, 2002. .
 Andy Johnson,  Warsaw Pact Order of Battle, June 1989. On-line here
 Jerzy Kajetanowicz, Wojsko Polskie w Układzie Warszawskim 1955-1985, 7 November 2009. On-line here

External links 
Polska szykowała Zachodowi atomową zagładę, 17 lutego 2012, Maritime Front planning from 1950s.

Orders of battle
Polish Land Forces
Polish People's Republic